The 1942 Manchester Clayton by-election was held on 17 October 1942.  The by-election was held due to the death  of the incumbent Labour MP, John Jagger.  It was won by the Labour candidate Harry Thorneycroft.

References

1942 in England
1942 elections in the United Kingdom
Clayton, 1942
1940s in Manchester